"Bringing It Back" is a song written by Gregg Gordon and originally recorded by Elvis Presley for his album Today.

Released as a single (with "Pieces of My Life" on the opposite side) on September 20, 1975, the song reached number 65 on the Billboard Hot 100.

Composition 
The song was written by Gregg Gordon.

Recording and release 
Elvis recorded the song on March 12, 1975, at RCA's Studio C in Hollywood for his album Today. The session featured James Burton, John Wilkinson and Charlie Hodge on guitar, Duke Bardwell on bass, Ronnie Tutt on drums, Glen D. Hardin and Tony Brown on piano, David Briggs and Greg Gordon on clavinet; the recordings were later overdubbed by Johnny Christopher and Chip Young on guitar, Norbert Putnam and Mike Leech on bass, Richard F. Morris on percussion, Charles L. Rose on saxophone, Harvey L. Thompson on trombone, Harrison Calloway on trumpet, Ronald Eades on junior baritone saxophone and The Holladays on additional vocals.

On September 20, 1975, "with absolutely nothing new to release, and no prospects of another recording session in sight", RCA Victor released "Bringing It Back" and another song from the same album, "Pieces of My Life", as a single. As the Elvis Presley official website states it, "the strategy was not lost on a public that had already bought well-worn material once in numbers that were unlikely to be repeated". "Bringing It Back" reached number 65 on the Billboard Hot 100, and "Pieces of My Life" number 33 on the Billboard country chart.

Track listing

Charts

Notes 
1.  Titled "Bringin' It Back" on the 2005 Follow That Dream re-issue of the album Today

References

External links 
 
 Bringing It Back on the Elvis Presley official website

1975 songs
1975 singles
Elvis Presley songs